Villestofte is a village and western suburb of  Odense, in Funen, Denmark.  It lies immediately to the southeast of Korup.

References

Suburbs of Odense
Populated places in Funen